Peter O'Donnell (28 February 1939 – 9 January 2008) was an Australian sailor and Olympic champion. He competed at the 1964 Summer Olympics in Tokyo and won a gold medal in the 5.5 metre class, with the boat Barrenjoey and team members Bill Northam and James Sargeant.

In 2017, he was an inaugural inductee to the Australia Sailing Hall of Fame with Northam and Sargeant.

References

External links

1939 births
2008 deaths
Australian male sailors (sport)
Australian people of Irish descent
Sailors at the 1964 Summer Olympics – 5.5 Metre
Olympic sailors of Australia
Olympic gold medalists for Australia
Olympic medalists in sailing

Medalists at the 1964 Summer Olympics
20th-century Australian people